The Moldova men's national basketball team represents Moldova in international basketball. The team is governed by the Basketball Federation of Moldova.

In the past, Moldova has mostly competed in smaller competitions such as the European Championship for Small Countries, where they won silver medals in 2008 and 2012.

History
The Basketball Federation of Moldova was founded in 1991, after gaining independence from the Soviet Union. In 1992, Moldova became members of FIBA, with the national team playing in their first international match against Latvia a year later. A qualifier for the 1993 EuroBasket, in which they would lose 110–64.

Throughout the rest of the 1990s, Moldova wouldn't take part in any tournament until 2002, when the team entered the 2002 European Championship for Small Countries. Moldova went on to place fifth overall in the competition which featured eight teams. In 2006, Moldova entered the tournament for the second time, making it to the semi-finals before losing to Azerbaijan. After the loss, the team was relegated to the bronze medal match where they would fall once again, this time to Andorra.

Two years later, at the 2008 tournament, Moldova made it back to the semi-finals after going undefeated (3–0) in the group stage for the second consecutive tournament. This time, Moldova would prove too much for Andorra in an 85–74 victory to reach the final. There, the team would lose in a tightly contested match to Azerbaijan 78–80 to come away with the silver medal. For Moldova's next four appearances at the tournament, their best result would be another silver medal finish at the 2012 competition.

Competitive record

FIBA World Cup

Championship for Small Countries

EuroBasket

Team

Current roster
Roster for the 2018 FIBA European Championship for Small Countries.

Depth chart

Head coach position
 Alexandru Sestopal – (2010–2014)
 Vladimir Polyakh – (2015–2016)
 Oleg Pravdiuk – (2017–2018)

Past rosters
2016 FIBA European Championship for Small Countries: finished 5th among 8 teams

See also

Sport in Moldova
Moldova women's national basketball team
Moldova men's national under-20 basketball team
Moldova men's national under-18 basketball team
Moldova men's national under-16 basketball team
Moldovan National Division

References

External links
Official website
Moldova FIBA profile
Moldova National Team – Men at Eurobasket.com
Moldova Basketball Records at FIBA Archive

Men's national basketball teams
National sports teams of Moldova
1992 establishments in Moldova
Basketball in Moldova